The South Bergen Jointure Commission is a special education public school district based in Hasbrouck Heights on  New Jersey Route 17 South in Hasbrouck Heights, New Jersey near Teterboro Airport, serving the educational needs of classified students ages 3 to 21 who are autistic or multiply handicapped from southern Bergen County, New Jersey, United States.

As of the 2014-15 school year, the district and its three schools had an enrollment of 311 students and 53.6 classroom teachers (on an FTE basis), for a student–teacher ratio of 5.8:1.

Controversy
District Superintendent Dawn Fidanza resigned in October 2017 after the Office of Fiscal Accountability and Compliance of the New Jersey Department of Education found that she had transferred her daughter and created a new job position without the authorization of the district's board and had covered security cameras to conceal her daughter's actions in the district office. Described by The Record (Bergen County) as "one of New Jersey's highest paid school superintendents", Fidanza had been paid an annual salary of $236,000.

Schools
Schools in the district (with 2014-15 enrollment data from the National Center for Education Statistics.) are:
East Rutherford Campus (Pre-K)
Maywood Campus (152; PreK-5)
Scott Rossig, Principal
Lodi Middle School / High School (97 students; in grades 6-12)
Lauren N. Rosicki  Principal
Moonachie Campus (62; PreK-8)

Administration
Core members of the district's administration are:
Dr. Michael Kuchar, Superintendent
Susan Cucciniello, Business Administrator / Board Secretary

Constituent districts
The district's board of education is  representatives from the participating school districts:
Bogota Public Schools (K–12)
Carlstadt Public Schools (K–8)
Carlstadt-East Rutherford Regional School District – Regional (9–12)
East Rutherford School District (K–8)
Garfield Public Schools (K–12)
Hasbrouck Heights School District (K–12)
Lodi Public Schools (K–12)
Lyndhurst School District (K–12)
Moonachie School District (K–8)
North Arlington School District (K–12)
Rutherford School District (K–12)
South Hackensack School District (K–8)
Wallington Public Schools (K–12)
Wood-Ridge School District (K–12)

References

Further reading

External links
South Bergen Jointure Commission

Data for the South Bergen Jointure Commission, National Center for Education Statistics

Hasbrouck Heights, New Jersey
School districts in Bergen County, New Jersey